By George is a 1967 play about George Bernard Shaw based on his writings.

The play was profiled in the William Goldman book The Season: A Candid Look at Broadway.

References

External links
 

1967 plays